Mark Stephen Moraghan (born 27 January 1963) is an English actor and singer. He has appeared in many British drama series including Peak Practice,  London's Burning  and Heartbeat. He is most famous for being the narrator for the children's television show Thomas & Friends from the seventeenth to twenty-first seasons, and his roles as Greg Shadwick in Brookside, Ray Wyatt in Dream Team, Owen Davies in Holby City and Adrian Atkins in Coronation Street.

Life and career
Moraghan was born in Toxteth, Liverpool on 27 January 1963. He started acting in 1978, when the BBC held auditions in his high school for the TV play Lies, and he was selected. On 14 May 1988, Moraghan started his professional acting career playing a ferryman in the comedy Help!, and he subsequently went on to play in many TV series and several films. His longest running role was Owen Davies, a Consultant Obstetrician, in Holby City which he played from 2001 until 2005. He also appeared in a television commercial for the fabric softener 'Bounce' in 1996 with fellow Liverpudlian Katy Carmichael. He was recently a member of the cast of the British independent film Allies (2014).

Moraghan may be best known for his acting, but he also sings and in 2006 he starred in a musical production of Willy Russell's "Our Day Out" at Liverpool's Royal Court Theatre.

He performed as a backing vocalist and percussionist in the Liverpool band Personal Column in the late 1970s. In 2006, Moraghan came second in the BBC singing competition Just the Two of Us. His singing partner was Atomic Kitten singer Natasha Hamilton with whom he sang classic songs like "Islands in the Stream" and "With You I'm Born Again". He has also appeared on Lily Savage's Blankety Blank.

He will starred and co-directed the made-for-TV film Stepdad.

In 2008, Moraghan appeared in Celebrity MasterChef, reaching the final alongside Andi Peters and eventual champion Liz McClarnon.

On 9 April 2009, it was announced that Moraghan was touring the UK in a theatre production of Brian Clemens' play Strictly Murder, alongside Nick Barclay, Katie Funk, David Rumelle and Miriam Miller.

Moraghan's swing album, Moonlight's Back in Style (words by Nicky Campbell) was released on Linn Records on 14 September 2009. He sang the title song from the album on GMTV on 2 September 2009.

From 2013 to 2017, Moraghan became the narrator on the children's television show Thomas & Friends, succeeding both Michael Angelis and Michael Brandon (for both the UK and the US, respectively). He is also narrator for the Thomas & Friends specials/films, King of the Railway, Tale of the Brave, The Adventure Begins, Sodor's Legend of the Lost Treasure, The Great Race and Journey Beyond Sodor. Despite having John Hasler and Joseph May take over his narration duties from 2018 onwards, Mark said that he will still work on Thomas & Friends. He returned in Season 22 to voice Dexter, an abandoned passenger coach who was found by Duck and restored as a mobile classroom. He also portrayed Mr Evans, a stationmaster who reads books from The Railway Series, and other stories about Thomas and his friends to the audience in the web series "Storytime with Mr. Evans" which aired from the 1 to 7 March 2019. He then went on to return to his role as narrator as part of the podcast: Thomas & Friends Storytime airing from June 2020 to December 2021.  

Prior to narrating Thomas & Friends, Moraghan has appeared in other children's television shows The Lodge and Wilderness Edge which were both dramas and both made for ITV's children's programming block CITV.

In 2017, he appeared as recurring character Tim Richards in Emmerdale.

On December 2017, Mark starred in Jack and the Beanstalk Pantomime in Bournemouth where he played the devilish Fleshcreep.

Filmography

Film

Television

References

External links
 Official Mark Moraghan website
 

1963 births
Living people
20th-century English male actors
21st-century English male actors
English male soap opera actors
Male actors from Liverpool
People from Toxteth